John Henry "J.H." Taylor (19 March 1871 – 10 February 1963) was an English professional golfer and one of the pioneers of the modern game of golf. Taylor is considered to be one of the best golfers of all time. He was a significant golf course architect. Taylor helped to found the British PGA, the world's first, and became respected for his administrative work. He also wrote two notable golf books.

Biography
Taylor was born in Northam, Devon. He was a member of the fabled Great Triumvirate of the sport in his day, along with Harry Vardon and James Braid, and he won The Open Championship five times. Born into a working-class family, and orphaned as a boy, he began work as a caddie and labourer at the Royal North Devon Golf Club (also known as Westward Ho!) at the age of eleven. He was employed as a caddie and houseboy by the Hutchinson family and was tasked to carry the bag of Horace Hutchinson. He became a professional golfer at 19, and was employed by Burnham & Berrow Golf Club, the Winchester (later Royal Winchester) Golf Club – while there winning in successive years the first two of his Open Championships – then the Royal Wimbledon Golf Club, before eventually moving to the Royal Mid-Surrey Golf Club from 1899 until his retirement in 1946.

In 1901, Taylor was a co-founder and the first chairman of the British Professional Golfers' Association. This was the first association for professional golfers in the world. Bernard Darwin wrote that Taylor "had turned a feckless company into a self-respecting and respected body of men".

Taylor was a factor in the Open Championship from age 22 in 1893, until age 55, when he tied for 11th place in 1926. His five Open victories all took place before the First World War.

Open Championship wins:
 1894 – Royal St George's
 1895 – St Andrews
 1900 – St Andrews
 1909 – Royal Cinque Ports
 1913 – Royal Liverpool Golf Club

Taylor captained the 1933 Great Britain Ryder Cup team to a win over the United States, and remains the only captain on either side never to have played in any of the matches.

Taylor was also involved in designing courses across England including York Golf Club in 1903, Hindhead Golf Club in 1904, Andover Golf Club in 1907, Frilford Heath's Red Course in 1908, Hainault Golf Club's Upper Course in 1909, Heaton Park Golf Club (Manchester) in 1912, Hainault Golf Club's Lower Course in 1923, Bigbury Golf Club in South Devon in 1926, Pinner Hill Golf Club (Middlesex) 1927, Axe Cliff Golf Club (Seaton, Devon) in 1920s and Batchwood Hall Golf Club (St Albans) in 1935. He is attributed with being the inventor of the 'dogleg', although holes of that form had existed on many courses before Taylor began golf course design (for example No. 7 at Old Course at St Andrews and No. 4 at Prestwick Golf Club). He was made an honorary member of The Royal and Ancient Golf Club of St Andrews in 1949, and was president of Royal Birkdale, whose course he had designed, in 1957.

A housing development in his hometown of Northam was named in his honour (JH Taylor Drive).

Tournament wins 

Note: This list may be incomplete
1891 Challenge Match Play (Eng)
1894 The Open Championship
1895 The Open Championship
1900 The Open Championship
1901 Tooting Bec Cup, Islay Tournament, West Lancashire Professional Tournament
1904 News of the World Match Play
1908 French Open, News of the World Match Play
1909 The Open Championship, Cruden Bay Professional Tournament, French Open
1910 Southern Professional Foursomes Tournament (with Josh Taylor)
1912 German Open
1913 The Open Championship
1919 St Annes Old Links Tournament
1920 Amateurs and Professionals Foursomes Tournament (with James Braid)
1921 Roehampton Invitation Tournament

Major championships are shown in bold.

Major championships

Wins (5)

Results timeline 

Note: Taylor only played in The Open Championship and the U.S. Open.

NYF = Tournament not yet founded
NT = No tournament
CUT = missed the half-way cut
"T" indicates a tie for a place

Team appearances
England–Scotland Professional Match (representing England): 1903, 1904 (tie), 1905 (tie), 1906 (winners) 1907 (winners), 1909 (winners), 1910 (winners), 1912 (tie), 1913 (winners)
France vs Great Britain (representing Great Britain): 1908 (winners)
Coronation Match (representing the Professionals): 1911 (winners)
Great Britain vs USA (representing Great Britain): 1921 (winners)
Seniors vs Juniors (representing the Seniors): 1928 (winners)
Ryder Cup (representing Great Britain): 1933 (non-playing captain, winners)

Writings
 Taylor on Golf: Impressions, Comments and Hints, by J.H. Taylor, London, Hutchinson & Co., 1902.
 Golf: My Life's Work, by J.H. Taylor, London, 1953.

See also 
List of men's major championships winning golfers
List of golfers with most wins in one PGA Tour event

References

External links 

John Henry Taylor Profile at GolfEurope.com
The History of the Game of Golf The Great Triumvirate
John Henry Taylor Profile at Golf Legends
Society of Hickory Golfers Archives SoHG Archives
http://www.artisans.golf UK List of all Artisans Golf clubs

English male golfers
Golf course architects
Golf administrators
Golf writers and broadcasters
Winners of men's major golf championships
World Golf Hall of Fame inductees
People from Northam, Devon
1871 births
1963 deaths